Radio Donji Vakuf is a Bosnian local public radio station, broadcasting from Donji Vakuf, Bosnia and Herzegovina.

Radio Donji Vakuf was launched on 16 September 1978 by the municipal council of Donji Vakuf. In Yugoslavia and in SR Bosnia and Herzegovina, it was part of local/municipal Radio Sarajevo network affiliate. This radio station broadcasts a variety of programs such as music, sport, local news and talk shows. Program is mainly produced in Bosnian language.

Estimated number of potential listeners of Radio Donji Vakuf is around 17,499.

Frequencies
 Donji Vakuf

See also 
List of radio stations in Bosnia and Herzegovina

References

External links 
 www.radiodonjivakuf.com.ba
 Communications Regulatory Agency of Bosnia and Herzegovina

Donji Vakuf
Radio stations established in 1975